A conditional joke is a joke meant for a qualified audience only. If a joke requires from the audience a certain knowledge or a belief, then Ted Cohen calls such jokes hermetic. Possessing prior knowledge and understanding of the topic, which in turn enables them to understand the joke. Such ability is also called the prerequisite condition for laughter. The conditional joke is one of two main categories of jokes, according to Ted Cohen; the main one being a universal joke, which does not require familiarity with the hermetic language of a conditional joke. 

Conditional jokes often depend on the internalized negative stereotypes held by the audience toward a targeted group of people. Such affective disposition can also explain the persistence of ethnic jokes in multicultural societies. Although they can be understood by many, the conditional jokes usually don't make ridiculed individuals laugh at the punch line.

The most common type of conditional jokes, which target the jargon and all topics specific to professions and occupations, include the doctor jokes (surgeons, internists, psychiatrists, etc.), the lawyers and politicians, musicians, and the rabbi jokes among many. Other hermetic jokes which target ethnicity include Polish jokes made in the US, Irish jokes made in England, Ukrainian jokes made in Russia, Newfie jokes made in Canada, Sardarji jokes made in India, Russian jokes about ethnicities, Texas jokes, Jewish jokes made by non-Jews, the Black people jokes, and numerous others.

See also
 In-joke
 Ethnic stereotype
 An Englishman, an Irishman and a Scotsman
 Stereotype

References 

Jokes
Humour